Tonimbuk is a bounded rural locality in Victoria, Australia,  south-east of Melbourne's Central Business District, located within the Shire of Cardinia local government area. Tonimbuk recorded a population of 229 at the 2021 census.

History

A Telegraph Office was open at Tonimbuk from 1953 until 1959.

Devastating fires in early March 2019 almost wiped this town off the map. It has since recovered and, like the state forests and farmlands that surround it, is now growing again.

See also
 Shire of Pakenham – Tonimbuk was previously within this former local government area.

References

Towns in Victoria (Australia)
Shire of Cardinia